Redemption's Son is the third studio album by Joseph Arthur. The double album was first released in the UK only on May 20, 2002, due to Joseph being dropped by Virgin Records/EMI in the US. Eventually, Enjoy Records picked up the record and released it stateside on November 26, 2002 with a slightly different track listing and alternate artwork.

The song "September Baby"  was covered by Joseph's friend Greg Connors, and appeared on Connors' 2009 album Full Moon Flashlight. Hubcap City's Bill Taft also features in the song, providing a haunting cornet solo to the song.

Track listing

Singles
In the US, Enjoy Records released a promo-only radio single for "Honey and the Moon" in January 2003. In the UK, the song was re-recorded for release as a single in 2007. Additionally, three other songs from the album were released as promo-only singles in the UK and US.

 "In the Night" (UK promo, July 8, 2002) 
 "I Would Rather Hide" (UK promo, 2002) 
 "Honey and the Moon" (US promo, January 2003) 
 "Nation of Slaves" (US promo, 2003) 
 "Honey and the Moon" (new radio edit) (March 26, 2007)

Are You With Us?
In 2002, a promo CD titled Are You With Us? was released via Virgin Records. The CD featured 15 tracks, most of which would appear on the finalized track listing of Redemption's Son. As this was not the official finalized release, and considering that Joseph was dropped by Virgin Records, few promos were made.

 "I Would Rather Hide"
 "Forgive Your Heart"
 "Permission"
 "Innocent World"
 "You Could Be in Jail"
 "Nation of Slaves"
 "You've Been Loved"
 "Let's Embrace"
 "Evidence"
 "Buy a Bag"
 "September Baby"
 "Honey and the Moon"
 "Build Back Up"
 "Blue Lips"
 "You Are the Dark"

"Forgive Your Heart" is an unreleased track. "Build Back Up" is a song Joseph wrote shortly after the September 11, 2001 terrorist attacks. The song first appeared on the compilation album Wish You Were Here: Love Songs for New York in April 2002.

Album credits
 All songs written by Joseph Arthur.
 Produced by Joseph Arthur, except:
 "Buy a Bag," "The Termite Song," and "Favorite Girl" produced by Joseph Arthur and Ben Findlay.
 Additional production by Pat Sansone, Mike Napolitano, and Tchad Blake.
 Recorded at Ernest Hemingway Studios, Mike Napolitano Studios, Sear Sound, The Magic Shop, Real World Studios, and Tony Berg's place.
 Mixed by Tchad Blake at Real World Studios; assisted by Claire Lewis and Marco Migliari, except:
 "Favorite Girl" mixed by Ben Findlay.
 Mastered by Bob Ludwig at Gateway Mastering.
 "Redemption's Son"
 Joseph Arthur - vocals, guitars, synthesizer
 Pat Sansone - bass, mellotron
 Greg Wieczorek - drums
 Rene Lopez - percussion
 Engineered by Mike Napolitano
 "Honey and the Moon"
 Joseph Arthur - vocals, guitars, synthesizer
 Pat Sansone - bass, mellotron
 Ged Lynch - drums
 Cyro Baptista - percussion
 Engineered by Roger Moutenot and Tchad Blake
 "You Could Be in Jail"
 Joseph Arthur - vocals, guitars, synthesizers, bass, drums, programming
 Engineered by Joseph Arthur and Mike Napolitano
 "Dear Lord"
 Joseph Arthur - vocals, guitars, harmonica
 Pat Sansone - bass, organ
 Greg Wieczorek - drums
 Engineered by Roger Moutenot
 "I Would Rather Hide"
 Joseph Arthur - lead and background vocals, guitars, synthesizers
 Pat Sansone - bass, mellotron, lead guitar, background vocals
 Greg Wieczorek - drums
 Engineered by Mike Napolitano
 "Innocent World"
 Joseph Arthur - vocals, guitars, synthesizers, drums
 Pat Sansone - mellotron
 Cyro Baptista - percussion
 Engineered by Ben Findlay
 "September Baby"
 Joseph Arthur - lead and background vocals, guitars, synthesizer
 Pat Sansone - bass, mellotron, percussion, background vocals
 Greg Wieczorek - drums
 Engineered by Roger Moutenot
 "Nation of Slaves"
 Joseph Arthur - vocals, guitars, synthesizers, bass, programming
 Ben Perowsky - drums
 Engineered by Joseph Arthur and Roger Moutenot
 "Evidence"
 Joseph Arthur - vocals, guitars, synthesizers, bass, programming
 Engineered by Joseph Arthur and Mike Napolitano
 "Buy a Bag"
 Joseph Arthur - vocals, guitars, bass, programming
 Engineered by Ben Findlay
 "Let's Embrace"
 Joseph Arthur - vocals, guitars
 Pat Sansone - bass
 Greg Wieczorek - drums
 Engineered by Roger Moutenot and Mike Napolitano
 "The Termite Song"
 Joseph Arthur - vocals, guitars, piano, moog, bass, hammer dulcimer, programming
 Engineered by Ben Findlay
 "Permission"
 Joseph Arthur - vocals, guitars, synthesizers, bass, drums, programming
 Engineered by Joseph Arthur and Mike Napolitano
 "Favorite Girl"
 Joseph Arthur - lead and background vocals, guitars, piano, bass
 Nadia Lanman - cellos
 Dave Power - drums
 Ben Findlay - background vocals
 Engineered by Ben Findlay
 "You Are the Dark"
 Joseph Arthur - vocals, guitar, synthesizer, fretless basses, "thunderstorm"
 Engineered by Joseph Arthur
 "In the Night"
 Joseph Arthur - lead and background vocals, guitars, synthesizer
 Pat Sansone - bass, electric piano, background vocals
 Greg Wieczorek - drums, background vocals
 Engineered by Roger Moutenot
 "Blue Lips"
 Joseph Arthur - vocals, guitars
 Pat Sansone - bass, electric piano, background vocals
 Greg Wieczorek - drums
 Engineered by Mike Napolitano
 "You've Been Loved"
 Joseph Arthur - vocals, guitars, pianos
 Pat Sansone - mellotron
 Ged Lynch - drums
 Engineered by Ben Findlay and Tchad Blake
 Sculptures and artwork by Rigby Maricoast.
 Photography and package design by Zachary James Larner.
 Cover photography (US release) by Valdet Demiri.

References

Joseph Arthur albums
2002 albums
Real World Records albums